Balbinos is a municipality in the state of São Paulo in Brazil. The population is 5,934 (2020 est.) in an area of 91.6 km². The elevation is 460 m.

References

Municipalities in São Paulo (state)